In alchemy and philosophy, prima materia, materia prima or first matter (for a philosophical exposition refer to: Prime Matter), is the ubiquitous starting material required for the alchemical magnum opus and the creation of the philosopher's stone. It is the primitive formless base of all matter similar to chaos, the quintessence or aether. Esoteric alchemists describe the prima materia using simile, and compare it to concepts like the anima mundi.

History
The concept of prima materia is sometimes attributed to Aristotle. The earliest roots of the idea can be found in the philosophy of Anaxagoras, who described the nous in relation to chaos. Empedocles' cosmogony is also relevant.

When alchemy developed in Greco-Roman Egypt on the foundations of Greek philosophy, it included the concept of prima materia as a central tenet. Mary Anne Atwood uses words attributed to Arnaldus de Villa Nova to describe the role of prima materia in the fundamental theory of alchemy: "That there abides in nature a certain pure matter, which, being discovered and brought by art to perfection, converts to itself proportionally all imperfect bodies that it touches." Although descriptions of the prima materia have changed throughout history, the concept has remained central to alchemical thought.

Properties
Alchemical authors used similes to describe the universal nature of the prima materia. Arthur Edward Waite  states that all alchemical writers concealed its "true name". Since the prima materia has all the qualities and properties of elementary things, the names of all kinds of things were assigned to it. A similar account can be found in the Theatrum Chemicum:

Comparisons have been made to Hyle, the primal fire, Proteus, Light, and Mercury. Martin Ruland the Younger lists more than fifty synonyms for the prima materia in his 1612 alchemical dictionary. His text includes justifications for the names and comparisons.  He repeats that, "the philosophers have so greatly admired the Creature of God which is called the Primal Matter, especially concerning its efficacy and mystery, that they have given to it many names, and almost every possible description, for they have not known how to sufficiently praise it." Waite lists an additional eighty four names.

See also
Arche
Individuation
Theory of Forms
Yliaster

References

Alchemical substances
Mythological substances